The 1985 Auburn Tigers football team represented Auburn University in the 1985 NCAA Division I-A football season.

Season
Bo Jackson rushed for 1,786 yards, which was the second best single-season performance in SEC history behind Herschel Walker's 1,891 rushing yards for the Georgia in 1981. For his performance, Jackson was awarded the Heisman Trophy edging out over Iowa quarterback Chuck Long.  Auburn began the season ranked #1 in the AP Poll before losing to Tennessee on September 28.

Schedule

Roster

Game summaries

at Tennessee

No. 4 Florida State

No. 2 Florida

at No. 12 Georgia

    
    
    
    
    
    

Bo Jackson 19 Rush, 121 Yds

Alabama

    
    
    
    
    
    
    
    
    
    

Van Tiffin game winning field goal.

vs. No. 11 Texas A&M (Cotton Bowl Classic)

Awards and honors
Bo Jackson, Heisman Trophy
Bo Jackson, Walter Camp Award

Team players in the NFL

References

Auburn
Auburn Tigers football seasons
Auburn Tigers football